New York's 9th State Assembly district is one of the 150 districts in the New York State Assembly. It has been represented by Republican Michael Durso since 2021.

Geography
District 9 includes portions of Nassau and Suffolk counties. It includes portions of the towns of Oyster Bay, Babylon, and Islip, and the villages of Massapequa Park, Babylon, and Brightwaters. The district also includes the hamlets of South Farmingdale, Massapequa, West Babylon, West Islip, and portions of Fire Island and the Great South Bay.

Recent election results

2022

2020

2018

2017 special

2016

2014

2012

References

9
Nassau County, New York
Suffolk County, New York